Coast of Skeletons is a 1965 adventure film, directed by Robert Lynn and starring Richard Todd and Dale Robertson. It is a sequel to the 1963 film Death Drums Along the River, and just as that film, it uses the characters from Edgar Wallace's 1911 novel Sanders of the River and Zoltán Korda's 1935 film based on the novel, but placed in a totally different story. Coast of Skeletons was released in Germany as Sanders und das Schiff des Todes/ Sanders and the Ship of Death.

Plot
Following independence, the unnamed British colony where Commissioner Harry Sanders has been working for many years sacks its British police force. So Sanders returns to London, where he soon finds work for an insurance company, which wants him to oversee a project to dredge for diamonds in the shallow waters off South West Africa.

Sanders soon finds himself drawn into a web of insurance fraud, a secret hunt for World War II gold bullion, and a rivalrous love triangle between a flamboyant American diamond prospector, a former German U-boat commander in the employ of the American, and the German’s very young wife.

Main cast
 Richard Todd as Commissioner Harry Sanders 
 Dale Robertson as A.J. Magnus 
 Heinz Drache as Janny von Koltze 
 Marianne Koch as Helga 
 Elga Andersen as Elisabeth von Koltze 
 Derek Nimmo as Tom Hamilton 
 Gabriel Bayman as Charlie Singer 
 George Leech as Carlo Seton 
 Gordon Mulholland as Mr. Spyker 
 Josh du Toit as Hajo Petersen
 Dietmar Schönherr as Piet van Houten

External links
 
 
 
 

1965 films
British adventure films
British sequel films
Films based on British novels
Films based on works by Edgar Wallace
Films directed by Robert Lynn
Films set in Africa
Films set in London
Films shot in Namibia
Films shot in South Africa
German sequel films
Seafaring films
South African adventure films
Treasure hunt films
West German films
English-language German films
English-language South African films
South African sequel films
1960s English-language films
1960s British films